Velodromo Paolo Borsellino is a multi-use stadium in Palermo, Italy, located in the ZEN neighbourhood of the city, and currently home to local American football club Sharks Palermo and rugby football club Palermo Rugby 2005. It is named after Palermo magistrate and Mafia victim Paolo Borsellino.

The venue, originally thought as a velodrome which could also serve as a multi-use stadium, was completed in 1991, and hosted the 1994 UCI Track Cycling World Championships held in Palermo. The venue was successively used by association football club U.S. Città di Palermo in the late 1990s, because of the unavailability of their home venue, Stadio La Favorita. The venue was successively used by another Palermo-based football club, ASD Fincantieri Palermo, during the 2003–04 season in the Serie D, and was also used by the US Palermo under-19 team until 2007.

In 2007 US Palermo announced plans to build a new stadium in the city, and suggested about the possibility of demolishing the Velodromo and build the new football-only venue at its place. The issue is still under discussion.

Velodromo Borsellino as a music venue

Because of the unavailability of Palermo's main stadium, Stadio La Favorita, to host open air concerts, the Velodromo Borsellino was until 2013 Palermo's primary venue for large concerts. 
Over the years however, neglect by the local council due to lack of finances, as well as vandalism, have made this venue unsafe for public events.

During its days as a concert venue the Velodromo Borsellino had a maximum capacity of 30,000,  including general admission on the field. 
Below is an incomplete list of music artists who have performed at the Velodromo Borsellino:

Benny Benassi (1 June 2013) 
Checco Zalone (28 September 2011) 
DJ Hardwell (1 June 2012)  
Elton John (26 May 2004) 
Ennio Morricone (20 July 2007) 
Eros Ramazzotti (2 July 2004; 16 July 2006; 27 July 2010) 
Jamiroquai (2 July 2006) 
Jovanotti (22 May 2008; 6 July 2013) 
Laura Pausini (30 June 2005; 18 July 2009; 21 July 2012) 
Luciano Ligabue (13 June 2000; 5 July 2002; 22 July 2007; 7 September 2010) 
Lucio Dalla and Francesco de Gregori (31 July 2010) 
Modà (6 August 2011; 25 May 2013) 
Tiziano Ferro (30 June 2009; 25 July 2012) 
Vasco Rossi (28 June 2001; 25 June 2005) 
Zucchero (3 August 2008; 21 July 2011)

References

 

Football venues in Italy
Palermo F.C.
Velodromes in Italy
Cycle racing in Italy
Sports venues in Palermo
American football venues in Italy
Rugby union stadiums in Italy
Sports venues completed in 1991
1991 establishments in Italy